Riešė Eldership is an eldership in Lithuania, located in Vilnius District Municipality, north of Vilnius.

History 
In 1867, a 9th-10th century Dirham treasure minted by Abbasid and Saffarid nobility was found in Riešė. Lands and manor in the eldership were historically known since 16th century, when they belonged to the Vilnius Chapter. In 1681, the mansion was given rights to build a bridge across Riešė River and collect tolls.

18th-century saw the construction of Pikeliškės Manor. In 19th century, Riešė was the center of a volost. In 1939, a brick church was built in Didžioji Riešė.

In 2017, the official coat-of-arms of Riešė Eldership was approved by a presidential decree.

Geography 
The area is predominantly hilly and is situated in the Riešė Upland. Most landscapes, especially on the southern side, are undergoing rapid urbanization. The eldership is crossed by the Riešė River and reaches the Neris River to the east. There are several lakes, of which the largest is Lake Pikeliškės. Swamps and bogs can also be found.

There are 45 villages and 25 homesteads located within the eldership, the largest of which is Didžioji Riešė (2,520 inhabitants). Other villages include Pikeliškės, Skirgiškės, Raudondvaris, Ažulaukė and Jadvygiškės.

Notable places 

 Pikeliškės Manor - a former residential manor, summer residence of Józef Piłsudski.
 Riešė Church of St. Bishop Stanislaus - a historicist 1939 Catholic church.
 Europos Parkas (Park of Europe) - an open-air museum located in the geographical center of Europe.
Raudondvaris Manor, stables and farmhouses
Former Žudiškės Manor farmstead
Ancient settlement of Karveliškės
Ancient settlement of Užužerė
Ancient settlement of Verbiškės
Ancient settlements of Miškiniai
Jewish massacre site and grave near Joneikiškės
Stone of Mikulionys
Oak of Žudiškės
Raudonoji Bala Telmological Reserve
Vanaginė Geomorphological Reserve

Ethnic composition 
According to 2011 National Census data, the ethnic composition is as follows:

 Lithuanians - 59.2%
 Poles - 30.4%
 Russians - 6.1%

According to 2021 National Census data, out of 6386 inhabitants:
 Lithuanians - 4117 (64.5%)
 Poles - 1621 (25.4%)
 Russians - 360 (5.6%)

Gallery

References 

Elderships in Vilnius District Municipality